Reverted is a 1994 Polish drama film directed by Kazimierz Kutz. It was entered into the 19th Moscow International Film Festival.

Cast
 Zbigniew Zamachowski as Tomek Siwek
 Henryk Bista as Director Biernacki
 Marek Kondrat as Lieutenant Goliński
 Stanisław Górka as Militiaman Albin
 Zofia Rysiówna as Tomek's Mother
 Leszek Zduń as Young Worker
 Anna Waszczyk as Fela
 Maciej Maciejewski as Wedding Guest (as Wincenty Maciejewski)
 Magdalena Warzecha as Maciek's Wife
 Monika Bolly as Jadzia
 Krzysztof Janczar as Worker
 Ryszard Jabłoński as Worker
 Tomasz Schimscheiner as 'Solidarity' Member

References

External links
 

1994 films
1994 drama films
Polish drama films
1990s Polish-language films
Films directed by Kazimierz Kutz